Chibcha, Mosca, Muisca, Muysca (*/ˈmɨska/),  or Muysca de Bogotá,  was a language spoken by the Muisca people of the Muisca Confederation, one of the many indigenous cultures of the Americas. The Muisca inhabited the Altiplano Cundiboyacense of what today is the country of Colombia.

The name of the language Muysc Cubun in its own language means "language of the people", from muysca ("people") and cubun ("language" or "word"). Despite the disappearance of the language in the 17th century (approximately), several language revitalization processes are underway within the current Muisca communities. The Muisca people remain ethnically distinct and their communities are recognized by the Colombian state.

Important scholars who have contributed to the knowledge of the Chibcha language include Juan de Castellanos, Bernardo de Lugo, José Domingo Duquesne and Ezequiel Uricoechea.

History

In prehistorical times, in the Andean civilizations called preceramic, the population of northwestern South America migrated through the Darién Gap between the isthmus of Panama and Colombia. Other Chibchan languages are spoken in southern Central America and the Muisca and related indigenous groups took their language with them into the heart of Colombia where they comprised the Muisca Confederation, a cultural grouping.

Spanish colonization

As early as 1580 the authorities in Charcas, Quito, and Santa Fe de Bogotá mandated the establishment of schools in native languages and required that priests study these languages before ordination. In 1606 the entire clergy was ordered to provide religious instruction in Chibcha. The Chibcha language declined in the 18th century.

In 1770, King Charles III of Spain officially banned use of the language in the region  as part of a de-indigenization project. The ban remained in law until Colombia passed its constitution of 1991.

Modern history
Modern Muisca scholars as Diego Gómez have claimed that the variety of languages was much larger than previously thought and 
that in fact there was a Chibcha dialect continuum that extended throughout the Cordillera Oriental from the Sierra Nevada del Cocuy to the Sumapaz Páramo. The quick colonization of the Spanish and the improvised use of traveling translators reduced the differences between the versions of Chibcha over time.

Since 2008 a Spanish–Muysc cubun dictionary containing more than 3000 words has been published online. The project was partly financed by the University of Bergen, Norway.

Greetings in Chibcha 

  - hello (to 1 person)
  - hello to more people
  - Are you good? [How are you?]
  - I am / we are good
  - goodbye!

Alphabet and rough pronunciation 

The muysccubun alphabet consists of around 20 letters. The Muisca didn't have an "L" in their language. The letters are pronounced more or less as follows:

a - as in Spanish "casa"; ka - "enclosure" or "fence"
e - as in "action"; izhe - "street"
i - open "i" as in "'inca" - sié - "water" or "river"
o - short "o" as in "box" - to - "dog"
u - "ou" as in "you" - uba - "face"
y - between "i" and "e"; "a" in action - ty - "singing"
b - as in "bed", or as in Spanish "haba"; - bohozhá - "with"
between the vowels "y" it is pronounced [βw] - kyby - "to sleep"
ch - "sh" as in "shine", but with the tongue pushed backwards - chuta - "son" or "daughter"
f - between a "b" and "w" using both lips without producing sound, a short whistle - foï - "mantle"
before a "y" it's pronounced [ɸw] - fyzha - "everything"
g - "gh" as in "good", or as in Spanish "abogado"; - gata - "fire"
h - as in "hello" - huïá - "inwards"
ï - "i-e" as in Beelzebub - ïe - "road" or "prayer"
k - "c" as in "cold" - kony - "wheel"
m - "m" as in "man" - mika - "three"
before "y" it's pronounced [mw], as in "Muisca" - myska - "person" or "people"
in first position before a consonant it's pronounced [im] - mpkwaká - "thanks to"
n - "n" as in "nice" - nyky - "brother" or "sister"
in first position followed by a consonant it's pronounced [in] - ngá - "and"
p - "p" as in "people" - paba - "father"
before "y" it's pronounced [pw] as in Spanish "puente" -  - "heart"
s - "s" as in "sorry" - sahawá - "husband"
before "i" changes a little to "sh"; [ʃ] - sié - "water" or "river"
t - "t" as in "text" - yta - "hand"
w - "w" as in "wow!" - we - "house"
zh - as in "chorizo", but with the tongue to the back - zhysky - "head"

The accentuation of the words is like in Spanish on the second-last syllable except when an accent is shown: Bacata is Ba-CA-ta and Bacatá is Ba-ca-TA.

In case of repetition of the same vowel, the word can be shortened: fuhuchá ~ fuchá - "woman".

In Chibcha, words are made of combinations where sometimes vowels are in front of the word. When this happens in front of another vowel, the vowel changes as follows:
a-uba becomes oba - "his (or her, its) face"
a-ita becomes eta - "his base"
a-yta becomes ata - "his hand" (note: ata also means "one")

Sometimes this combination is not performed and the words are written with the prefix plus the new vowel:
a-ita would become eta but can be written as aeta, a-uba as aoba and a-yta as ayta

Numbers

The Muisca only had numbers one to ten and the 'perfect' number 20; gueta, used extensively in their complex lunisolar Muisca calendar. For numbers higher than 10 they used additions;  ("ten plus one") for eleven. Higher numbers were multiplications of twenty;  would be "five times twenty"; 100.

Structure and grammar

Subject
The subjects in Chibcha do not have genders or plurals. to thus can mean "male dog", "male dogs", "female dog" or "female dogs". To solve this, the Muisca used the numbers and the word for "man", cha, and "woman", fuhuchá, to specify gender and plural:
 to cha ata - "one male dog" (literally: "dog" "male" "one")
 to cha mika - "three male dogs" ("dog male three")
 to fuhuchá myhyká - "four female dogs"

Personal pronoun

Possessive pronoun
The possessive pronoun is placed before the word it refers to.

 i- is only used in combination with ch, n, s, t or zh; i-to = ito ("my dog")
 zh- becomes zhy- when followed by a consonant (except ï); zh-paba = zhypaba ("my father")
 in case of a ï, the letter is lost: zh-ïohozhá = zhohozhá ("my buttocks")
 m- becomes um- when followed by a consonant; m-ïoky = umïoky ("your book")
 zhy- and um- are shortened when the word starts with w; zhy-waïá & um-waïá = zhwaïá & mwaïá ("mi mother" & "your mother")
 when the word starts with h, zhy- and um- are shortened and the vowel following j repeated; zhy-hué & um-hué = zhuhué & muhué ("my sir" & "your sir")

Verbs
The Muisca used two types of verbs, ending on -skua and -suka;  ("to do") and guitysuka ("to whip") which have different forms in their grammatical conjugations.  is shown below, for verbs ending on -suka, see here.

Conjugations

Present tense or imperfect

Perfect and pluperfect

Future tense

Imperatives 

Volitive modality

Selection of words 
This list is a selection from the online dictionary and is sortable. Note the different potatoes and types of maize and their meaning.

Comparison to other Chibchan languages

Surviving words and education
Words of Muysccubun origin are still used in the department of Cundinamarca of which Bogotá is the capital, and the department of Boyacá, with capital Tunja. These include curuba (Colombian fruit banana passionfruit), toche (yellow oriole), guadua (a large bamboo used in construction) and tatacoa ("snake"). The Muisca descendants continue many traditional ways, such as the use of certain foods, use of coca for teas and healing rituals, and other aspects of natural ways, which are a respected part of culture in Colombia.

As the Muisca did not have words for imported technology or items in early colonial times, they borrowed them from Spanish, such as "shoe"; çapato, "sword"; espada, "knife"; cuchillo and other words.

The school is named Jizcamox (healing with the hands) in Chibcha.

Toponyms 

Most of the original Muisca names of the villages, rivers and national parks and some of the provinces in the central highlands of the Colombian Andes are kept or slightly altered. Usually the names refer to farmfields (ta), the Moon goddess Chía, her husband Sué, names of caciques, the topography of the region, built enclosures (ca) and animals of the region.

See also 

Quechua
Spanish conquest of the Chibchan Nations
Muisca numerals, calendar

References

Bibliography

Further reading

External links 

  Diccionario y gramática chibcha - World Digital Library
  Muysc cubun Project - with Muysc cubun–Spanish dictionary
  Archives and sources on the Chibcha language - Rosetta Project
  Animated video about the last Muisca rulers - Muysccubun is spoken with Spanish subtitles
 Muisca (Intercontinental Dictionary Series)

 
Chibchan languages
Extinct languages of South America
Indigenous peoples in Colombia
Languages of Colombia